The Arborg Ice Dawgs are a junior "B" ice hockey team based in Arborg, Manitoba and a member of the Capital Region Junior Hockey League. The team was founded in 2006 and a member of the Keystone Junior Hockey League (KJHL) until 2018.

They have qualified for three Manitoba Provincial Finals, winning two Manitoba Provincial Junior B Hockey Championship in their history in 2010–11 and 2011–12.

For the 2018-19 season the Ice Dawgs were one of five teams that departed the Keystone Junior Hockey League and established the Capital region Junior Hockey League.

Season-by-season record
Note: GP = Games played, W = Wins, L = Losses, T = Ties, OTL = Overtime Losses, Pts = Points, GF = Goals for, GA = Goals against,   PCT = Winning Percentage

Keystone Cup
Western Canadian Jr. B Championships (Northern Ontario to British Columbia)Six teams in round-robin play. 1st vs. 2nd for gold/silver & 3rd vs. 4th for bronze.

Team information

Team captains
 Brennan Zasitko, 2006–2007
 Myles Willis, 2007–2008
 Mackenzie Jones 2009–2010
 Bryant Gudmundson 2010–2011
 Brock McMahon 2012-2013
 Ryan Pochailo 2016-2017
 Derric Gulay 2017-2019
 Josh Roche 2019-2021
 Jack Einarson 2021-2022
 Tre Strachan 2022-Present

Coaches
 Dave Sigvaldason, 2006–2008
 Ray Neufeld & Kevin Campbell 2008–2009
 Jim Werbicki 2009–2012
 Ron Schalk 2012–2015
 Cody Didychuk 2015-2017
 Jim Werbicki 2017-2020
 Murray Monkman 2020-2022
 Scott Wong 2022-Present

External links
Keystonejr.ca
Official Site

Ice hockey teams in Manitoba
2006 establishments in Manitoba